HD 142 is a wide binary star system in the southern constellation of Phoenix. The main component has a yellow-white hue and is dimly visible to the naked eye with an apparent visual magnitude of 5.7. The system is located at a distance of 85.5 light years from the Sun based on parallax measurements, and is drifting further away with a radial velocity of +6 km/s.

The primary component is an F-type main-sequence star with a stellar classification of F7V, which indicates it is undergoing core hydrogen fusion. It is an estimated 2.5 billion years old and is spinning with a projected rotational velocity of 10 km/s. The star has 1.25 times the mass of the Sun and 1.4 times the Sun's radius. It is radiating 2.9 times the luminosity of the Sun from its photosphere at an effective temperature of 6,338 K.

A magnitude 11.5 companion star was detected in 1894 making this a binary star system. The binary companion was confirmed to be gravitationally bound in 2007 and determined to be a red dwarf of spectral type K8.5-M1.5 with 54% of the Sun's mass.


Planetary system
In 2001, the Anglo-Australian Planet Search team led by Chris Tinney announced the discovery of an extrasolar planet orbiting the primary star. An additional linear trend in the radial velocity data was noticed in 2006 that could have been due to another planet or to the stellar companion. In 2012, additional measurements allowed the detection of a second planet. A third possible planet with a period of 108 days was seen in the data, but with a false alarm probability of five percent. Another paper by the same team updated the parameters for b and c but did not mention the possible planet d.

An astrometric measurement of HD 142 b's inclination and true mass was published in 2022 as part of Gaia DR3. Another 2022 study determined the inclination and true mass of planet c, and confirmed the existence of planet d.

See also
 List of extrasolar planets

References

External links
 

F-type main-sequence stars
Planetary systems with two confirmed planets
Phoenix (constellation)
Durchmusterung objects
000142
000522
0006
Binary stars